Anthony Toi Leiato (born 26 August 1965, in Orange County, California) is an athlete who represented American Samoa.

Due to his ancestry Leiato competed in the 1996 Summer Olympics in Atlanta, he entered the shot put and he finished 34th out of 36 starters.

References

External links
 

1965 births
Living people
American people of Samoan descent
American Samoan male shot putters
Athletes (track and field) at the 1996 Summer Olympics
Olympic track and field athletes of American Samoa
Sportspeople from Orange County, California